The Dahe Solar Park is a 40 MWp photovoltaic power station located in Dahe Town, Zhangjiakou City, Hebei Province, in China. It uses fixed tilt arrays. 37 MW is from polysilicon arrays, 1 MW is from monocrystalline silicon, 1 MW is from monocrystalline back contact SPR-320E-WHTD arrays from SunPower and 1 MW is from thin film. A 20 MW storage system consists of batteries capable of storing a total of 63 MWh, to allow better use of the generated electricity.

See also

List of photovoltaic power stations
Photovoltaic power station
Photovoltaics

References

Photovoltaic power stations in China